Judith Beth Cefkin (born in 1953) is an American diplomat and former ambassador to five nations in Oceania. She served  concurrently as the ambassador to Fiji, Kiribati, Nauru, Tonga, and Tuvalu, while resident in Suva, Fiji.

Early life and education
Cefkin was born in New York to Rose (née) Mackanick and John Leo Cefkin. She grew up in Ft. Collins, Colorado, where her father was a professor of political science at Colorado State University. Cefkin attended Smith College, where she earned a B.A. in government in 1975. She then studied at the London School of Economics and Political Science, earning a master's degree in International Relations in 1977.

Career

After completing graduate studies, Cefkin became a television news producer. She worked as a legislative intern in Washington, D.C. and also worked in the Office of Technology Assessment for Congress.

In 1983 Cefkin embarked on a career in the Foreign Service. Her assignments have included ones in Thailand, France, Mexico and The Philippines. She served as deputy chief of mission at the U.S. Embassy in Bangkok.

She was nominated by President Barack Obama as ambassador to Fiji, Kiribati, Nauru, Tonga, and Tuvalu on July 9, 2014. Her nomination was confirmed by the Senate on November 19, 2014. She presented her credentials in the five nations between February and August 2015, and served until February 25, 2018.

Personal life
Cefkin is married to Paul Boyd, a foreign service officer who has also served as a police officer and member of the U.S Special Forces. 

In addition to English she speaks French, Thai, Bosnian and Spanish.

References

External links

 U.S. Embassy - Fiji
 U.S. Embassy Mission Leaders - Fiji
 U.S. Department of State Biography

1953 births
Living people
Alumni of the London School of Economics
Ambassadors of the United States to Fiji
Ambassadors of the United States to Kiribati
Ambassadors of the United States to Nauru
Ambassadors of the United States to Tuvalu
Ambassadors of the United States to Tonga
American women ambassadors
Obama administration personnel
Smith College alumni
United States Foreign Service personnel
21st-century American women
21st-century American diplomats